The 2013 New Zealand local elections were triennial elections to elect local government officials and District Health Board members, and the membership of other local bodies such as Licensing Trusts. All elections were conducted by postal ballot, with election day being Saturday 12 October 2013.

Electoral systems
The local elections were held using postal ballot. Most city and district councils and all but one regional council used the first-past-the-post (FPP) voting system, with the exception of the following six city and district councils that used the single transferable vote (STV) voting system:
 Dunedin City Council
 Kapiti Coast District Council
 Marlborough District Council
 Palmerston North City Council
 Porirua City Council
 Wellington City Council

The Wellington Regional Council was the sole regional council using the STV system.

Environment Canterbury and Kaipara District were under statutory management and no elections were held. All District Health Boards used the STV system.

Timeline
Under section 10 of the Local Electoral Act 2001, a "general election of members of every local authority or community board must be held on the second Saturday in October in every third year" from the date the Act came into effect in 2001, meaning 12 October 2013.

Key dates for the election as set out by the Electoral Commission are:

Political commentator Vernon Small thought that the government would likely try and combine the local elections with the asset sales referendum, but this did not happen. Instead, the referendum was held via postal ballot between 22 November and 13 December.

Mayoral elections

Notes

See also
2013 Auckland local elections
2013 Hamilton local elections and referendums
2013 Rangitikei local elections
2013 Wellington local elections

References

 
Local 2013
2013 in New Zealand
October 2013 events in New Zealand